
Gmina Rzeczyca is a rural gmina (administrative district) in Tomaszów Mazowiecki County, Łódź Voivodeship, in central Poland.

The gmina contains part of the protected area called Spała Landscape Park.

Villages
Gmina Rzeczyca contains the villages and settlements of Bartoszówka, Bobrowiec, Brzeg, Brzeziny, Brzozów, Glina, Grotowice, Gustawów, Jeziorzec, Kanice, Kawęczyn, Łęg, Lubocz, Roszkowa Wola, Rzeczyca, Sadykierz, Stanisławów, Wiechnowice and Zawady.

Neighbouring gminas
Gmina Rzeczyca is bordered by the gminas of Cielądz, Czerniewice, Inowłódz, Nowe Miasto nad Pilicą, Odrzywół and Poświętne.

References
 Polish official population figures 2006

Rzeczyca
Tomaszów Mazowiecki County